Siraj Kassam Teli (17 May 1953 – 8 December 2020) was a Pakistani industrialist. He died in Dubai on 8 December 2020 of a heart attack due to COVID-19.

Karachi Chamber of Commerce & Industry 
He was the president of the Karachi Chamber of Commerce and Industry and the head of the chamber's leading group.

Education and early life 
He graduated from Government College of Commerce & Economics, Karachi, in 1974. At Gul Ahmed Textile Mills Limited and Nakshbandi Industries he spent eleven years at the start of his career.

Leadership 
He always raised voice for the rights of Business and Industrial Community of Karachi.  To improve economic ties between India and Pakistan he on several occasions talked up business opportunities and productive developments.  He felt by resolving political issues and friendly and cordial relations could bring peace and prosperity in the region.

Awards 
For his outstanding contribution to the economic development of the country and, philanthropic and public work, Teli was awarded the Sitara-e-Imtiaz. He received Sitara-e-Imtiaz on 23 March 2011 from Mr. Asif Ali Zardari, President of Islamic Republic of Pakistan in recognition of his exceptional services for the promotion of Trade and Industry in Pakistan.

References

Pakistani industrialists
1953 births
2020 deaths
Recipients of Sitara-i-Imtiaz
People from Karachi
Deaths from the COVID-19 pandemic in the United Arab Emirates